Be the One is the second studio album by Jackie Jackson, released on September 9, 1989. The musicians included Paul Jackson, Jr., Jeff Lorber, Robert Brookins and Gerald Albright.

Track listing

Personnel
Jackie Jackson - lead vocals
Paul Jackson Jr. - guitar
Jeff Lorber - keyboards, percussion, drum programming 
Wayne Linsey - keyboards, drum programming
Robert Brookins - keyboards, drums
Clinton "Spud" Blanson - drums
Gerald Albright - saxophone on "Stuck On You"
Alex Brown, Marva King - harmonies on "Fun"

Charts

References

Official Website Jackie Jackson Discography

1989 albums
Jackie Jackson albums
Polydor Records albums